Cha-156 or No. 156 (Japanese: 第百五十六號驅潜特務艇) was a No.1-class auxiliary submarine chaser of the Imperial Japanese Navy that served during World War II.

History
She was laid down on 15 September 1943 and launched on 25 January 1944. She was completed on 31 March 1944 and assigned to the Saeki Defense Unit, Kure Defense Force, Kure Naval District. On 1 November 1944, she was reassigned to the Kaohsiung Defense Force, Formosa.

Convoy MI-27
On 15 November 1944, she departed Moji, Kitakyūshū destined for Miri, Borneo with fellow  Cha-157, Type C escort ship CD-61, Type D escort ship CD-134, and minesweeper , escorting convoy MI-27 consisting of four tankers (Awagawa Maru, Kyokuun Maru, Osakasan Maru, and Enkei Maru) and six transport/cargo ships (Shoho Maru, Matsuura Maru, Koshu Maru, and Chinkai Maru). Enkei Maru and Kyokuun Maru developed mechanical problems and were forced to return to Moji. The convoy was running parallel to Convoy Hi-81 which had left Imari on 14 November 1944 destined for Formosa to benefit from air cover provided by HI-81's escort carrier  which was carrying fourteen Nakajima B5N "Kate" torpedo bombers of the 931st Air Squadron, Saeki Naval Air Station. The two convoys converged together at times.

Sunfish torpedoed and damaged both Edogawa Maru and Seisho Maru while Peto torpedoed and sank Osakasan Maru (killing 142). Nearby, Spadefish spotted Shin'yō of HI-81 and fired six torpedoes four of which hit causing the carrier to burst into flames and sink (killing 1,130). W-101 and CD-61 were disattached from MI-27 to pick up survivors. On 18 November 1944, Sunfish torpedoed and sank the damaged Seisho Maru (killing 448) and the damaged Edogawa Maru (killing 2,083); while Peto torpedoed and sank Chinkai Maru (killing 39). After losing four of the eight ships being escorted, the remainder of convoy MI-27 arrived at Sijiao Island on 19 November 1944.

Demise
She was struck from the Navy List on 10 May 1945.

References

1944 ships
Maritime incidents in March 1945
World War II shipwrecks in the Pacific Ocean
Ships sunk by US aircraft
Auxiliary ships of the Imperial Japanese Navy
No.1-class auxiliary submarine chasers